Zarrinabad-e Darreh Shuri (also Romanized as Zarrīnābād-e Darreh Shūrī; also known as Zarrīnābād) is a village in Deris Rural District, in the Central District of Kazerun County, Fars Province, Iran. At the 2006 census, its population was 958, in 226 families.

References 

Populated places in Kazerun County